HADR may be:
 Aba Tenna Dejazmach Yilma International Airport ICAO code
 The combined efforts for humanitarian assistance and disaster relief
 Hughes HR-3000 also known as Hughes Air Defense Radar